RepliCel Life Sciences is a Canadian regenerative medicine company based in Vancouver, British Columbia.  The company focuses on development of cell therapies using a patient's own cells (autologous cell therapy).  The company has treatment development activities targeting chronic tendon injuries which have failed to heal properly, and hair restoration.  The company's expertise lies in isolation and exploitation of different cell populations found in the human hair follicle.

The company's business model is focused on establishing proof-of-concept for treatments leading to acquisition by a larger company.  An alternative business model has been reported which does not involve acquisition but rather partnership where technologies and methods are licensed to a partner which will commercialize them.

References

External links 
 Search for clinical trials sponsored by RepliCel at CT.gov

Companies based in Vancouver
Health care companies of Canada